Ionuț Cosmin Voicu (born 2 August 1984) is a Romanian former professional footballer who played as a right back for teams such as FC Brașov, Rapid București and Politehnica Iași, among others.

Honours
FC Brașov
Liga II: 2007–08

Rapid București
Liga III: 2018–19
Liga IV – Bucharest: 2017–18

External links
 
 

1984 births
Living people
People from Alexandria, Romania
Romanian footballers
Association football defenders
Liga I players
Liga II players
FC Argeș Pitești players
CS Inter Gaz București players
FC Brașov (1936) players
CS Mioveni players
FC Rapid București players
FC Politehnica Iași (2010) players
CS Gaz Metan Mediaș players